Sweet Attention is the third full-length studio album by American indie rock band Rookie of the Year. The follow-up to 2006's The Goodnight Moon was released on 5 August 2008. It is the band's fourth release and third studio album on label 111 Records. The album was produced by Matt Malpass. Prior to release of the album, Rookie of the Year posted "What is Love" and "Summer" up on their MySpace page.

An advance copy of the album leaked in June 2008, in response, the band released nine bonus unreleased tracks with the entire record which has been re-mixed and re-mastered.

Track listing
 "Feel Like New" – 3:31
 "Asleep with You" – 3:13
 "Falling from the Sky" – 3:30
 "Summer" – 3:53
 "What Is Love" – 3:51
 "Sooner or Later (The Next Move)" – 4:15
 "Any Longer" – 3:17
 "Vampire Vegas" – 3:08
 "My Ocean" – 3:44
 "Danger Zone" – 3:30
 "Sweet Attention" – 4:16
 "Savannah" – 3:35

Personnel
 Ryan Dunson – vocals
 Mike Kamerman – guitar, backing vocals
 Pat Murphy – bass guitar
 Brandon Schade – guitar
 Mick Parsons – drums

References

External links
Official Website
Pure Volume site
Rookie Of The Year official myspace
Rookie Of The Year Profile on AbsolutePunk.net

Rookie of the Year (band) albums
2008 albums